A by-election was held for the New South Wales Legislative Assembly electorate of Wollondilly on 23 January 1950 because of the resignation of Jeff Bate to successfully contest the federal seat of Macarthur at the 1949 election.

Dates

Result

Jeff Bate resigned to successfully contest the 1949 election for Macarthur.

See also
Electoral results for the district of Wollondilly
List of New South Wales state by-elections

References

1950 elections in Australia
New South Wales state by-elections
1950s in New South Wales